Seifollah Vahid Dastjerdi (1926–1999) was head of the Red Crescent Society of the Islamic Republic of Iran.

During political turmoil in Tehran following the 1987 Iranian pilgrim riots in Saudi Arabia, Seifollah Vahid Dastjerdi appeared on television speaking for Iran Red Crescent. In an interview seen on NBC Evening News for August 18, 1987, he claimed women victims of the violence had been deliberately killed.

In 1997, he was closely involved with Red Crescent's relief activities following the Ardabil earthquake.

He was the father of Marzieh Vahid-Dastjerdi.

References

1926 births
1999 deaths
Islamic Republican Party politicians